The Constitutional Laws of 1875 were the laws passed in France by the National Assembly between February and July 1875 which established the Third French Republic.

The constitution laws could be roughly divided into three laws:
 The Act of 24 February 1875 – The organization of the Senate
 The Act of 25 February 1875 – The organization of government
 The Act of 16 July 1875 – The relationship between governments

At that time France was not defined or organized by a genuine constitution. The situation continued during the Vichy Period, where the French Constitutional Law of 1940, along with Philippe Pétain's "Act No. 2", heavily circumscribed the 1875 laws. The laws were legally revoked only during the promulgation of the French Constitution of 1946.

Timeline of French constitutions

References
https://en.wikisource.org/wiki/French_Constitutional_Laws_of_1875

1875 in law
1875 in France
Constitutions of France
French Third Republic
Legal history of France
Uncodified constitutions